Dasht-e Enqolab (also Romanized as Dasht-e Enqolāb) is a village in Kavirat Rural District, Kavirat District, Aran va Bidgol County, Isfahan Province, Iran. At the 2006 census, its population was 11, in 4 families.

References 

Populated places in Aran va Bidgol County